Melbourne Central is a large shopping centre, office, and public transport hub in the city of Melbourne, Victoria, Australia. It was designed by Japanese architect Kisho Kurokawa, and opened in 1991. 

The shopping centre features a large glass cone, which houses the heritage-listed Coop's Shot Tower.

The Melbourne Central shopping and office development was constructed between 1986 and 1991 by Japanese firm Kumagai Gumi at a cost of $1.2 billion. The original anchor tenant was the Japanese department store Daimaru, which opened its first Australian store over six floors located between the shot tower and La Trobe Street. 

History
Large scale redevelopment of the city block bounded by Lonsdale, Swanston, La Trobe and Elizabeth Streets was studied in some detail during the 1960s and 1970s, being closely linked with work on the City Loop underground railway. Early work on the site commenced in 1971 when land on the south side of La Trobe Street was acquired, to enable the cut and cover construction of Museum Station (now known as Melbourne Central). With planning for the site being carried out by the Melbourne Underground Rail Loop Authority from 1980, the railway station opened in 1981, but protracted negotiations failed to find an anchor tenant for the development, resulting in the State Government of Victoria deciding in 1983 that a private developer should be sought.
By the time registrations closed in March 1984 a total of 28 submissions had been received from developers, with eight selected organisations invited to respond. A government panel sat in April 1985 to evaluate the responses, and one month later announced their preferred scheme: designed by Hassell Architects for EKG Developments, a joint venture between Australian property developer Essington Limited and Japanese construction firm Kumagai Gumi. The project compromised an 85 floor office tower, with a hotel at the Swanston Street end, joined by a huge sloping walled atrium 20 floors high, over a shopping atrium opening down to the station platforms, designed by Hassell. 

The contract was signed soon after but without Essington Limited, who were removed by the State Government after a number of directors were linked to the Nugan Hand Bank. It was also at this time that Kisho Kurokawa was brought on board as architect, with Hassell and Bates, Smart & McCutcheon compensated by becoming the joint documenters of the scheme. It was also scaled back, with the hotel removed, and the office tower reduced to 72 storeys and then 55, and the atrium reduce to a tall cone, and a circular opening through the shopping levels. An arm of shops connecting to Lonsdale Street was also added, replacing 19th century warehouses, and via footbridges connected through to the Myer store. An anchor tenant was also found, with Japanese department store Daimaru signed on due to the involvement of the Japanese Sumitomo Bank on the project.

Melbourne Central opened in 1991, with the large Daimaru store attempting to compete with local, established department stores Myer and David Jones. The centre never became profitable for owner Kumagai Gumi, who sold 97.1 per cent to Australian property manager GPT Group for $408 million in 1999, retaining 2.9 per cent to write the asset off over 20 years. Kumugai abandoned this plan in 2001, selling their remaining share to GPT for $17 million. Daimaru closed their department store in 2002, paying five years' rent ($30 million) in return for abandoning their lease commitment which ended in 2016. Daimaru never turned a profit on the store, costing its shareholders approximately $200 million.

With half the total retail space empty due to the loss of Daimaru, GPT announced a $195 million plan to renovate the centre in April 2002. Eventually costing $260 million, the renovated centre with a postmodern design by architects Ashton Raggatt McDougall, aimed to open the complex to more natural light, new street-front shopping strips, and bubble-like additions to the footbridge across Little Lonsdale Street, but largely compromised the design of Kurokawa. The works also compromised access to the adjacent Melbourne Central railway station, removing direct access to Swanston Street and directing passengers through the shopping centre. The renovation took the book value of the complex to $1033 million in 2010, up from $229.8 million as of at 31 December 2001.

In 2010 plans for a second redevelopment were unveiled by GPT, being a $30 million stage one of a $75 million project. Again using Ashton Raggatt McDougall architects, the north-east corner at Swanston Street is again being altered, a new food precinct will be opened, and a new entry at Elizabeth Street built to create another cross-block connection through the precinct.

Office tower

The Melbourne Central Office Tower comprises 57 levels, 46 of which are office floors. The tower is owned by GPT Wholesale Office Fund.

ME Bank and Allianz have signed up to move into the building replacing space currently tenanted by BP and Telstra. They have taken up building signage rights.

Monuments

Coop's Shot Tower

Contained underneath the shopping centre's massive glass cone sits the Coop's Shot Tower which was built on the site in 1888.  After last being used in 1961, the tower was retained to become a focal-point of the centre. R.M. Williams and the Shot Tower Museum are located inside the Shot Tower. The tower was also featured in the opening sequence of the 1997 Jackie Chan film Mr. Nice Guy.

The Marionette Watch
The watch, designed by Seiko, was given as a gift to the people of Melbourne. The watch has a twelve and a half metre, two tonne chain, which was taken down during the centre's refurbishment and has since not been re-attached. Every hour, on the hour, a marionette display drops down from the bottom of the watch with Australian galahs, cockatoos and two minstrels performing Waltzing Matilda, under the watchful gaze of some koalas. The Seiko branding has since been removed.

The Glass Cone

The Glass Cone is the largest glass structure of its type in the world. The cone is 20 storeys high, weighs 490 tonnes and has 924 glass panes. The glass panes are cleaned by a specially designed mechanical system. Upon the centre's opening it was referred to as the "Magic Cone".

The Vertical Garden
The vertical garden was pioneered by internationally renowned French artist and scientist, Patrick Blanc. The garden is soil-less and was a major part in transforming part of the Shot Tower's walls into a lush, leafy landmark. However, the running cost proved expensive and in 2013 it was replaced with an advertising billboard.

Tenants

Melbourne Central currently has 292 stores. Current key tenants include adidas, Coles, Sephora, JD Sports, Country Road, R. M. Williams, Cotton On, JB Hi-Fi, Rebel Sport, Nike, Sportsgirl, Mecca Maxima, MORPHE, DJI and Calvin Klein. The centre is also home to the largest LEGO® Certified Store in the Southern Hemisphere.

There is a glass footbridge across Lonsdale Street to Myer, with the layout of the centre allowing people to walk almost uninterrupted through some form of a shopping centre for over half of the city's width or 5 city blocks, from La Trobe street to Little Collins Street. This occurs via Melbourne Central which joins to Myer which in turn joins to David Jones over Bourke Street Mall. The glass footbridge was closed when Myer Melbourne vacated their Lonsdale store building. The footbridge re-opened in April 2014 when the Emporium Melbourne shopping centre opened.

Melbourne Central has a broad range of food outlets in two separate food courts. There is a food court on the lower ground level, on the same level as the entrance to the train station, where there are outlets such as McDonald's and KFC. Another food court is located on the Food On 2 level, accessible directly from the Corner of LaTrobe and Swantston Sts. by escalator.
Food On 2 was closed in 2011 for redevelopment whilst adjacent to this, a brand new, larger food court, called the Dining Hall, opened in the first stage of its $30 million redevelopment.

Level 3 of the centre features a Hoyts Cinema complex as well as ten pin bowling, the Melbourne Central Lion Hotel and various restaurants and bars. In 2020, another dining precinct opened in the centre, near the corner of Elizabeth and La Trobe streets. This precinct features numerous restaurants and retail stores, while the surrounding area was renovated to provide easier access to the Dining Hall on level 2, and the Hoyts Cinema complex on level 3.

Gallery

See also

List of tallest buildings in Melbourne

References

Notes
 Melbourne Central : A Case Study in Post-Modern Urbanisation

External links

Shopping centres in Melbourne
Office buildings in Melbourne
Skyscrapers in Melbourne
Buildings and structures completed in 1991
Shopping malls established in 1991
1991 establishments in Australia
Tourist attractions in Melbourne
Skyscraper office buildings in Australia
Elizabeth Street, Melbourne
Buildings and structures in Melbourne City Centre
Landmarks in Melbourne